Minettia longipennis is a species of fly in the family Lauxaniidae. It is found in the Palearctic.

Minettia longipennis is 3 to 4.5 mm. long. It is rounded with a black shiny thorax and long orange tinted wings sometimes held out at a horizontal angle. The habitat is hedgerows and wooded areas. Adults occur from May to September with a population peak in June. Larvae feed on fungi on dead leaves.

References

Lauxaniidae
Insects described in 1794
Muscomorph flies of Europe